Elimiotis or Elimeia was a region of Upper Macedonia that was located along the Haliacmon river. The capital of Elimiotis was Aiani, located in the modern municipality of Kozani, Western Macedonia. It was bordered by Orestis and Eordaea in the north, Pieria in the east, Perrhaebia/Thessaly in the south and Parauaea in the west,  and was inhabited by the Greek tribe of Elimiotes. In earlier times, it was independent and the Derdas family ruled the local kingdom from its capital Aiane. However, later it lost its independence and by 355 BC, Elimiotis was part of the kingdom of Macedon.

Archons of Elimiotis
 Arrhidaeus (born  before 513 BC)
 Derdas I (505–435)
 Sirras (437–390)
 Derdas II (385–360)
 Derdas III (360–355), last king of Elimiotis

Notable people 
 Antigonus I Monophthalmus (382-301 BC), Hellenistic ruler.
 Calas, general and satrap of Alexander the Great.
 Coenus, general of Alexander the Great.
 Cleander, officer of Alexander the Great.
 Harpalus, noble and boyhood friend of Alexander the Great.
 Machatas of Elimeia, noble of Elimiotis.
 Philip of Machatas, general of Alexander the Great.
 Polemocrates, noble of Elimiotis.

See also
Aiani
Aiani Archaeological Museum

References 

 D. C. Samsaris, Historical Geography of the Roman province of Macedonia  (The Department of Western Macedonia today) (in Greek), Thessaloniki 1989 (Society for Macedonian Studies),  p. 44, 69. .
(it) Giuseppe, Valenza. Elamiti Elimioti Elimi Il Teatro Genealogico degli Elimi nel crocevia del Mediterraneo. Marostica. 2022. ISBN 978-88-908854-2-6.

External links
 Archaeological Museum of Aiani
 Current locations of Elimeia  region

Upper Macedonia
 
Geography of ancient Macedonia